Insley may refer to:

John Insley Blair (1802–1899), American entrepreneur, railroad magnate, philanthropist
Deborah Ann Insley Dingell (born 1953), Democratic Party politician
Earl Insley (1911–1958), American football coach and player
Jill Insley, financial journalist for The Sunday Times
Lawson Insley, 19th-century daguerreotyptist in Australia and New Zealand
Trevor Insley (born 1977), former American football wide receiver
Will Insley (1929–2011), American painter, architect, planner of utopian urban models
John Insley Blair Larned (1883–1955), suffragan bishop of the Episcopal Diocese of Long Island

See also
Insley Manufacturing Co. produced heavy construction equipment, based in Indianapolis, Indiana
Fort Insley, constructed to help protect the town and post of Fort Scott from Confederate forces
Insley-Astley syndrome or Otospondylomegaepiphyseal dysplasia, an autosomal recessive disorder of bone growth